Izola may refer to:

 Izola, town in southwestern Slovenia on the Adriatic coast of the Istrian peninsula
 Izola (appliances), historic brand names in Greek industrial history
 Municipality of Izola, municipality in the traditional region of the Littoral in southwestern Slovenia. 
 MNK Izola, Slovenian football club from Izola which competes in the Slovenian Third League
 NK Izola,  Slovenian football club from Izola

See also 

 Isola (disambiguation)